Omry Perel (born 15 February 1995) is an Israeli footballer who plays as a midfielder, winger or forward for Shimshon Tel Aviv.

Career

As a youth player, Perel joined the youth academy of Maccabi Tel Aviv, Israel's most successful club.

In 2009, he trialed for the youth academies of FC Utrecht in the Netherlands and Chelsea, one of the most successful English teams.

Before the second half of 2011/12, Perel was sent on loan to Maccabi Herzliya in the Israeli second division, where he said, "I had no desire to play. I lost my desire and was disappointed. I lost the meaning of the football game in my eyes. During this period Alon Hazan called me. "Home to try to persuade me to continue playing football. He influenced me greatly."

In 2012, Perel was sent on loan to Israeli top flight outfit Hapoel Ramat Gan, where he made 5 appearances and scored 0 goals and suffered relegation, helping them win the 2012–13 Israel State Cup. On 6 October 2012, he debuted for Hapoel Ramat Gan during a 0-2 loss to Maccabi Haifa.

In 2013, Perel was sent on loan to Hakoah Ramat Gan in the Israeli second division, where he said, "this season in retrospect was the hardest season of my career. A lot of coaches changed, dozens of players came and went. I also had problems in the military at the time and in addition to all of May 2015 I underwent hernia surgery. After a recovery period of 3 months I went back to training with the goal of finding a group, but before I could find a group I had severe stomach pains. There was a concern that I had a bowel disease called colitis. I was forbidden to practice until all the tests were completed and the results returned. By the time I ruled out the disease, I had already reached February 2016, without the possibility of signing with any team in the Premier League."

In 2016, Perel signed for English fifth division side Macclesfield Town, where he said, "the club is a bit similar to the level at the bottom of the [Israeli] national league."

In 2017, he signed for Hyde United in the English seventh division.

In 2018, Perel signed for Israeli third division club Hapoel Herzliya.

Before the second half of 2018/19, he signed for Shimshon Tel Aviv in the Israeli fourth division.

References

External links
 
 Omry Perel at playmakerstats.com

Israeli footballers
1994 births
Living people
Macclesfield Town F.C. players
Association football wingers
Hakoah Maccabi Amidar Ramat Gan F.C. players
Maccabi Herzliya F.C. players
Association football midfielders
Association football forwards
Shimshon Tel Aviv F.C. players
F.C. Ironi Or Yehuda players
Hyde United F.C. players
Hapoel Ramat Gan F.C. players
Israeli Premier League players
Liga Leumit players
National League (English football) players
Expatriate footballers in England
Israeli expatriate sportspeople in England